Midland Hotel is the name of several English hotels. Many were former railway hotels constructed by the Midland Railway.  It may refer to:

 Midland Hotel, Manchester 
 Midland Hotel, Bradford
 Midland Hotel, Derby, also known as Hallmark Hotel Derby Midland
 Midland Hotel, Morecambe (1933 – present)
 Midland Hotel, Morecambe (1871–1932), originally named North Western Hotel, Morecambe (1848–1871)
 Midland Grand Hotel at St Pancras station, London, now known as St Pancras Renaissance London Hotel
 Midland Hotel, adjacent to Mansfield railway station, Nottinghamshire